Beaver Mills, also known as Beaver Meadow, is a ghost town in Mobile County, Alabama, United States, near U.S. Route 45, south of Citronelle.  It was the site of a paper mill that was also used as a uniform depot during the American Civil War. A post office operated under the name Beaver Meadow from 1890 to 1906.

References

External links
Beaver Mills at Ghosttowns.com
Alabama Ghost Towns DigitalAlabama.com
Front view of the residence of Colonel E. M. Hudson at Beaver Meadow, Alabama in 1895
Side view of the residence of Colonel E. M. Hudson at Beaver Meadow, Alabama in 1895
Loading produce into a M&O Railroad boxcar at Beaver Meadow in 1895

Ghost towns in Alabama
Populated places in Mobile County, Alabama